The Harrison Islands are members of the Canadian Arctic Archipelago in the territory of Nunavut. They are located in western Gulf of Boothia's Pelly Bay, east of the Ross Peninsula. The group lies north of the Arctic Circle, south of the Queen Elizabeth Islands, and southeast of the Astronomical Society Islands.

References 

Islands of the Gulf of Boothia
Uninhabited islands of Kitikmeot Region